Kyle Wailes (born October 19, 1983 in West Hill, Ontario) is the Chief Executive Officer and Board Member of value-based care company, Wellvana Health. Wellvana provides tools, technologies, analytics, and resources for healthcare providers to successfully and seamlessly transition to value-based care. Wailes is known internationally as a Canadian indoor lacrosse player. Wailes played for the Philadelphia Wings of the National Lacrosse League, played collegiate lacrosse at Brown University, and was a junior hockey player in the Ontario Hockey League.

National Lacrosse League career
Wailes was a First Round Draft pick (5th Overall) by the Calgary Roughnecks in the 2006 NLL Entry Draft. Wailes was acquired by the Philadelphia Wings from Calgary on December 18, 2006 in exchange for the Wings’ first pick in the 2007 NLL Entry Draft.  He was named the NLL's Rookie of the Week in both Week 3 and Week 8 of the 2007 season.

After sitting out the 2008 NLL season due to work visa problems, Wailes will rejoin the Philadelphia Wings for the 2009 season after signing a four-year contract with the team.

College career
Wailes graduated from Brown University with a bachelor's degree in pre-medicine and neuroscience and holds an M.B.A. from the Kellogg School of Management at Northwestern University. As a junior at Brown University, he led the Bears collegiate lacrosse in scoring with 35 points (5 goals, 30 assists) and was named to the All-Ivy League Team.

Canadian Box career

Junior
In 2000, Wailes led the OLA Jr. B league in assists with the Clarington Green Gaels, who won the Founders Cup Championship.
Wailes twice won the OLA Jr. A scoring title with the Toronto Beaches. In 2004, he was named league MVP, and was awarded the "Jim Veltman Award" for Most Outstanding Player and the "B.W. Evans Award" for Top Graduating Player.

Senior
Wailes was selected first overall in the 2005 Major Series Lacrosse draft by the Brooklin Redmen. However, Wailes only played five games during his rookie season and has not played Senior lacrosse since.

Hockey career
Wailes played hockey in the Ontario Hockey League with the Barrie Colts and the Sault Ste. Marie Greyhounds. In the 1999-2000 season, he was a member of the OHL Champion Barrie Colts.

Career statistics

NLL

OLA

References

1983 births
Living people
Brown University alumni
Canadian lacrosse players
Lacrosse people from Ontario
Philadelphia Wings players
Sportspeople from Toronto